Micheál Clery or Michael Cleary was an Irish Fianna Fáil politician, solicitor and teacher. He was first elected to Dáil Éireann as a Fianna Fáil Teachta Dála (TD) at the September 1927 general election for the Mayo North constituency. He was re-elected at every subsequent general election up to 1944. 

He resigned in October 1945 during the 12th Dáil following his appointment as County Registrar of Dublin. The subsequent by-election was held on 4 December 1945 and was won by Bernard Commons of Clann na Talmhan.

References

Year of birth missing
Year of death missing
Fianna Fáil TDs
Members of the 6th Dáil
Members of the 7th Dáil
Members of the 8th Dáil
Members of the 9th Dáil
Members of the 10th Dáil
Members of the 11th Dáil
Members of the 12th Dáil
Politicians from County Mayo
Irish solicitors
Irish schoolteachers